Li Su (died June 192) was a Chinese military officer serving under the warlords Dong Zhuo and Lü Bu during the Eastern Han dynasty of China.

Life
Li Su was from Wuyuan Commandery (五原郡), which was around present-day Baotou, Inner Mongolia. He served as a Cavalry Commandant (騎都尉) under Dong Zhuo, the warlord who controlled the Han central government and figurehead Emperor Xian between 189 and 192.

In May 192, Li Su joined Lü Bu and Wang Yun in a plot to assassinate Dong Zhuo in Chang'an. He led about a dozen soldiers and pretended to stand guard near the entrance. When Dong Zhuo arrived, Li Su tried to stab him with a ji, but Dong Zhuo's body armour saved him. Lü Bu then came up close and killed Dong Zhuo.

Later in 192, Lü Bu ordered Li Su to lead troops to attack and kill Niu Fu, Dong Zhuo's son-in-law. However, Niu Fu defeated Li Su in battle and forced him to retreat to Hongnong Commandery (弘農郡; south of present-day Lingbao City, Henan), where Lü Bu had him executed for his failure.

In Romance of the Three Kingdoms
In the 14th-century historical novel Romance of the Three Kingdoms, Li Su was also credited with persuading Lü Bu to kill his adoptive father Ding Yuan and join Dong Zhuo. Among the many gifts Li Su brought along with him when he visited Lü Bu, the most outstanding one was the horse called the Red Hare.

See also
 Lists of people of the Three Kingdoms

References

 Chen, Shou (3rd century). Records of the Three Kingdoms (Sanguozhi).
 
 Fan, Ye (5th century). Book of the Later Han (Houhanshu).
 Luo, Guanzhong (14th century). Romance of the Three Kingdoms (Sanguo Yanyi).

192 deaths
2nd-century births
2nd-century executions
Chinese military officers
Dong Zhuo and associates
Executed Han dynasty people
Executed military personnel
Executed people from Inner Mongolia
Lü Bu and associates
People executed by the Han dynasty